The 2019 Football West Season was the sixth season since the National Premier Leagues was established in Western Australia.

Pre-season changes

League Tables

2019 National Premier Leagues WA
The competition reverted to a twelve-team format, and was played over 22 rounds, followed by an end of season Top 4 Cup competition. Promotion and Relegation was dependent on whether Gwelup Croatia (as the team finishing first in the State League 1) met a series of eligibility criteria, which they did; this meant that Stirling Lions would be relegated for the following season.

Top Four Cup

2019 WA State League 1
The 2019 WA State League 1 season was played over 22 rounds.

Inter-Divisional promotion/relegation play-offs

2019 WA State League 2
The 2019 WA State League 2 season was played over 22 rounds.

2019 Women's Premier League

The 2019 Women's Premier League was played over 20 rounds as a quadruple round-robin. This was the last season in the Premier League format, before the introduction of the National Premier Leagues WA Women competition in 2020.

Top Four Cup

2019 State Cup

Western Australian soccer clubs competed in 2019 for the State Cup, known as the Belt Up State Cup for sponsorship reasons. Clubs entered from the National Premier Leagues WA, the two divisions of the State League, a limited number of teams from various divisions of the 2019 Amateur League, Metropolitan League and Masters League competitions, and from regional teams from the South West and Great Southern regions. 

This knockout competition was won by Floreat Athena, their seventh title.

The competition also served as the Western Australian Preliminary rounds for the 2019 FFA Cup. In addition to the A-League club Perth Glory, the two finalists – Bayswater City and Floreat Athena – qualified for the final rounds, and entered at the Round of 32. All three clubs were eliminated in this round.

References

External links
Football West Official website

Soccer in Western Australia
Football West
2019